Sniper Elite is a tactical shooter video game series developed by Rebellion Developments. It is a third-person tactical shooter that emphasises a less direct approach to combat, encouraging the player as a sniper to use stealth and keep distance from enemy soldiers.

The games follow Karl Fairburne, a German-American Office of Strategic Services operative battling Axis forces during World War II. Thus far, the series has been met with relatively positive reviews. More than 20 million Sniper Elite games have been sold.

Gameplay
Sniper Elite is a third-person shooter that involves stealth and first-person shooter game elements. Many of the single player levels allow multiple routes for the players to take in order to avoid direct firefights. Set in World War II, the player character, a German-American OSS operative named Karl Fairburne, utilises appropriate weapons for the era. The sniper rifle is the primary weapon throughout the game, though additional side arms (submachine guns and pistols) can be used depending on the situation. In addition to hand grenades, the player can also deploy tripwire booby traps, land mines and dynamite. The player can also shoot the enemies' own grenades to trigger an explosion. Binoculars are used to tag enemies in view, displaying their position and movements to the player. Different postures such as crouching or lying prone can steady a shot, and the player can take a deep breath to "focus" for increased accuracy. Realistic ballistics are optional, taking into consideration factors such as wind direction and strength and bullet drop, potentially altering the outcome of a shot even with the use of the scope. Introduced in Sniper Elite V2 is the "X-Ray Kill Cam", a feature where upon a successful and skilled shot will, in slow motion, follow the bullet from the rifle to the target's point of impact, showing an anatomically correct x-ray of the body part being hit and the damage the bullet causes to the organs and/or bones. In Sniper Elite III, stealth mechanics were reworked. An eye icon squints or opens to denote the player's level of detection by the enemy. Enemy soldiers will also have a circle meter over their heads to indicate alert status. Players are then forced to relocate periodically to prevent detection with a white ghost image to mark their last known position and the enemy will search a wider area.

Games

Novels
Rebellion Developments' book imprint Abaddon Books released a novel inspired by the game, Sniper Elite: The Spear of Destiny written by Jasper Bark. In this book, Karl Fairburne's mission is to stop Nazi SS general Helmstadt from selling a working atomic bomb to the Soviets.

A short story written by Scott K. Andrews titled Sniper Elite V2 - Target Hitler was released as an E-Book.

A 2018 comic based on the series, Sniper Elite: Resistance written by Keith Richardson and Patrick Goddard. The story follows Karl Fairburne as he parachutes into occupied France on a mission to destroy a secret weapon, but instead of a silent mission of sabotage he finds the local resistance compromised and the SS waiting to play a deadly game of cat and mouse in the terrified streets of an ancient town.

Film
On 29 March 2021, Variety reports that a film adaptation of Sniper Elite is in development with Marla Studios' Jean-Julien Baronnet producing along with the game's producer and CEO of Rebellion Jason Kingsley, Gary Graham writing and Brad Peyton directing with the film follows Karl Fairburne engage in a cat-and-mouse chase through the streets of London at the height of the Blitz during World War II, as he tries to save British Prime Minister Winston Churchill from a Nazi assassin.

References

External links 
 

 
505 Games games
Rebellion Developments
Video game franchises
Video game franchises introduced in 2005
Video games adapted into comics